Philipp Dotzer (born 5 August 1926) was a German water polo player. He competed in the men's tournament at the 1952 Summer Olympics.

References

External links
 

1926 births
Possibly living people
German male water polo players
Olympic water polo players of Germany
Water polo players at the 1952 Summer Olympics
Place of birth missing (living people)